The production manager of a musical ensemble is in charge of the technical crew. The technical crew moves independently of the band because the technical crew must arrive at the gig location by the morning of the show to start setting up the equipment. The band members usually arrive much later, just before the event itself.

Responsibilities of production manager
As the tour is being planned, the Production Manager must contract for services such as lighting, sound, trucking, rigging, bussing, and catering. The competition is fierce between the companies offering such services. Specific discussions must take place between the Production Manager and the providers clarifying the quality of the equipment, management and crew, as well as the prices bid.

After all these major decisions have been made by the Production Manager, a final production meeting is held before rehearsals have begun. Here all the key personnel meet for the first time.

Tour manager
At this point the tour manager takes over the leadership, as the technical success of the tour depends on the crew members working together effectively and efficiently.

References

See also
Tour Manager

Entertainment occupations
Stagecraft
Stage crew